Cesare Vecellio (c. 1521 – c. 1601)  was an Italian engraver and painter of the Renaissance, active in Venice.

He was the cousin of the painter Titian. Like Titian, he was born in Cadore in the Veneto. He accompanied Titian to Augsburg in 1548, and seems to have worked as his assistant. Many of Cesare's pictures were ascribed, perhaps knowingly, to Titian. In the Milan Pinacoteca there is a small Trinity by Cesare. He died in Venice. The crude woodcuts for book assembling contemporary fashion from across the world, De gli Habiti Antichi e Modérni di Diversi Parti di Mondo published in Venice in 1590 by Cesare as if they were his works, may in fact belong to Christopher Krieger from Nuremberg. They depict the garb, sometimes fanciful and imagined, of individuals, men and women, from Tsars to Tribeswomen from the Arabian Desert to Muscovite nobles to Arabian nobles to Inca nobles.

Cesare's brother, Fabrizio di Cadore or Ettore, was little known beyond his native place, for the Council-hall of which he is said to have painted a fine picture. He died in 1580.

See also
For more details of on contemporary fashion see 1550-1600 in Western European fashion.

References

Further reading

External links 

Vecellio.net - The Works of Cesare Vecellio

1530s births
1600s deaths
People from the Province of Belluno
16th-century Italian painters
Italian male painters
17th-century Italian painters
Painters from Venice
Italian Renaissance painters
Italian printmakers
History of clothing (Western fashion)
Titian